is a railway station on the Aizu Railway Aizu Line in the town of Shimogō, Minamiaizu District, Fukushima Prefecture, Japan, operated by the Aizu Railway. The station is notable for its thatched roof.

Lines

Station layout
Yunokami-Onsen Station has two opposed side platforms connected by a level crossing. The half-timbered thatch roof station building has an irori open hearth in the waiting room. The station is staffed.

Platforms

Adjacent stations

History
The station was renamed to its present name on July 16, 1987.

Surrounding area

Egawa Post Office
 Yunokami-Onsen
 Ōuchi-juku

See also
 List of railway stations in Japan

References

External links

 Aizu Railway Station information 

Railway stations in Fukushima Prefecture
Aizu Line
Railway stations in Japan opened in 1932
Railway stations in Japan opened in 1947
Shimogō, Fukushima